Brian Zachary Pillman (born September 9, 1993), better known by the ring name Brian Pillman Jr., is an American professional wrestler currently signed to All Elite Wrestling (AEW). He is also known for his time in Major League Wrestling (MLW). Pillman is a second-generation wrestler, as he is the son of professional wrestler Brian Pillman.

Early life
Pillman is the son of professional wrestler Brian Pillman Sr. and model Melanie Pillman. The younger Pillman had four sisters, Danielle and Brittany Pillman, Alexis Reed and Skylar King, as well as one brother, Jesse Morgan. His sister Alexis became a professional wrestling valet under the ring name Lexi Pillman but died in 2009. Pillman attended Dixie Heights High School in Edgewood, Kentucky, where he played football. He graduated in 2011 and furthered his education by attending college. Pillman earned a degree at Northern Kentucky University in Information Systems.

Professional wrestling career

Independent circuit (2017–2021) 
In February 2017, Pillman announced he would be following his father's footsteps becoming a professional wrestler. He was trained by Lance Storm at his school, the Storm Wrestling Academy, in Calgary, Alberta, Canada.

Pillman's first match was on December 18, 2017, when he used the ring name "Alex King", a tribute to his sisters Alexis Reed and Skylar King. Pillman made his professional debut for Combat Zone Wrestling on January 28, 2018, at Dojo Wars 162 against Mike Del for the CZW Medal of Valor Championship. Pillman was defeated in the match by submission. Pillman would have one more match in CZW, in a tag team match, teaming with Teddy Hart and faced Anthony Bennet and Jimmy Lloyd at Super Show V on January 26.

On January 18, 2020, Pillman was a surprise 16th entrant in a 16-man Battle Royale at IWC Reloaded 6.0. He did not win the match, but he appeared in the Main Event, helping IWC Champion Jack Pollock win the match. After the match, Pillman revealed he has signed a contract with IWC, and that part of his contract was a shot at the IWC Championship at the promotion's February event. On February 15, Pillman defeated Sam Adonis, Aramis, Lance Archer, Black Taurus, Michael Elgin, Andrew Everett, and Alex Zayne in a War of Attrition match to win the vacant Warrior Wrestling Championship. The title was left vacant due to injury to former champion Brian Cage. On September 12, 2020, in Washington, Pennsylvania, he won the Super Indy Championship for International Wrestling Cartel (IWC).

Major League Wrestling (2018–2021) 

In late 2018, Pillman signed a contract with Major League Wrestling (MLW). When he first came in, he was mentored by his father's World Championship Wrestling rival Kevin Sullivan. He then turned on Sullivan and joined forces with Teddy Hart and Davey Boy Smith Jr., creating the New Era Hart Foundation. This took place in a backstage segment where Pillman attacked Sullivan with a cane, causing Sullivan to bleed. On July 9, 2021, it was reported that Pillman was no longer working with MLW as his contract had expired.

All Elite Wrestling

Early appearances (2019) 
In May 2019, Pillman was a participant in a battle royal at All Elite Wrestling's inaugural pay-per-view event, Double or Nothing. In July 2020, with MLW shut down due to the COVID-19 pandemic, Pillman began to appear in All Elite Wrestling (AEW), wrestling on both their flagship show Dynamite, and their online show Dark.  Pillman remained contracted to MLW, but was allowed to work for AEW as well. He made his in ring return on the July 7th episode of Dark in a losing effort against Shawn Spears. After this, Pillman was used as mostly as an enhancement talent losing to the likes of Brian Cage and Eddie Kingston.

The Varsity Blonds (2020–present) 
In late July, Pillman began teaming with fellow AEW newcomer Griff Garrison, still competing mostly on Dark. Pillman and Garrison made their main show debut in an eight-man tag match, teaming with Joey Janela and Sonny Kiss in a losing effort against The Butcher and The Blade and The Lucha Brothers. The team failed to pick up a win on either shows until the September 25th episode of Dark, when they defeated Cezar Bononi and David Ali, marking their first victory as a team. During their losing streak, they lost to the likes of Private Party, FTR, The Inner Circle, The Butcher and The Blade, and The Hybrid 2. After picking up their first win, the team went on a second month long losing streak which ended after they defeated Sean Maluta and Alex Chamberlain on the November 3rd episode of Dark. By early December, Pillman and Garrison had adopted the team name The Varsity Blonds, a tribute to Pillman's father. In their first match with their new name, The Varsity Blonds defeated The Dark Order (Colt Cabana and Alex Reynolds) in a tag team match on the December 8, 2020 episodes of Dark. On May 11, 2021 Julia Hart started aligning herself with The Varsity Blonds and made appearances with them for several months. On July 12, 2021, Pillman signed a full time deal with All Elite Wrestling making him an official member of the roster.

Personal life 
Pillman had a strained relationship with his mother Melanie due to her battles with drug addiction following his father's death when Pillman was four years old. Pillman, who was primarily raised by his aunt Linda Pillman (his dad's sister) growing up, shared in a shoot interview that he felt his mother was feigning her grieving during her infamous interview with Vince McMahon on WWF Raw is War one day after his dad's death, as their marriage was already going through the divorce process at the time and simply wanted a pay day for drugs. Unlike most wrestling fans and the media, Pillman didn't fault the WWF for the somewhat tactless interview with his mother, as he credited the promotion for trying to help out him and his sisters as much as possible financially.

Pillman's relationship with his mother started improving after his wrestling career started; this included her making regular appearances during Pillman's live Twitch streams and sharing stories about his father. Melanie was found dead from an apparent drug overdose on June 1, 2022, at the age of 56, as confirmed by Pillman.

Championships and accomplishments
Cauliflower Alley Club
Rising Star Award (2020)
International Wrestling Cartel
IWC Super Indy Championship (1 time)
KFW Wrestling
KFW Championship (1 time)
Major League Wrestling
MLW World Tag Team Championship (1 time) – with Davey Boy Smith Jr. and Teddy Hart
Rookie of the Year (2018)
Ohio Valley Wrestling
OVW Heavyweight Championship (1 time)
Pro Wrestling Illustrated
 Rookie of the Year (2019)
 Ranked No. 135 of the top 500 singles wrestlers in the PWI 500 in 2021
Supreme Wrestling
Supreme Mid America Heavyweight Championship (1 time)
Warrior Wrestling
 Warrior Wrestling Championship (1 time)
World Class Wrestling Outlaws
WCWO Heavyweight Championship (1 time)

References

External links

 
 
 
 
 MLW Profile
 

1993 births
All Elite Wrestling personnel
American male professional wrestlers
Brian Pillman
Dixie Heights High School alumni
Living people
Northern Kentucky University alumni
People from Kenton County, Kentucky
Professional wrestlers from Kentucky
Sportspeople from Kentucky
The Hart Foundation members
Twitch (service) streamers
21st-century professional wrestlers
20th-century American people
21st-century American people
MLW World Tag Team Champions
OVW Heavyweight Champions